Megachile aurulenta is a species of bee in the family Megachilidae. It was described by Pasteels in 1970. The species is found in South Africa.

References

Aurulenta
Insects described in 1970